P'arsman VI (sometimes Latinized as Pharasmanes), of the Chosroid Dynasty, became the king of Iberia (Kartli, eastern Georgia) in 561. The length of his reign is unknown. The royal power was largely nominal at that time as the Sassanid Empire dominated Iberia.

He was the fraternal nephew of P’arsman V, his predecessor. P'arsman VI himself was succeeded by his son, Bakur III.

See also
 Sasanian Iberia

References

Chosroid kings of Iberia
6th-century monarchs in Asia
Vassal rulers of the Sasanian Empire
Georgians from the Sasanian Empire